Edzard Schaper (30 September 1908 – 29 January 1984) was a German author. Many of his works describe the persecution of Christians.

Awards 
1967 Gottfried-Keller-Preis
1969 Konrad Adenauer Prize for literature

Works 
 Der letzte Gast. Bonz, Stuttgart 1927.
 Die Bekenntnisse des Försters Patrik Doyle. Bonz, Stuttgart 1928.
 Die Insel Tütarsaar. Insel, Leipzig 1933.
 Erde über dem Meer. Roman einer kämpfenden Jugend. Die Buchgemeinde, Berlin 1934.
 Die sterbende Kirche. Insel, Leipzig 1935.
 Der Henker. Insel, Leipzig 1940; durchgesehene Neuausgabe: Artemis, Zürich 1978, .
 Der letzte Advent. Atlantis, Freiburg 1949.
 Die Freiheit des Gefangenen. Hegner, Köln 1950.
 Die Macht der Ohnmächtigen. Hegner, Köln 1952.
 Der Gouverneur oder Der glückselige Schuldner. Hegner, Köln 1954.
 Die letzte Welt. Hegner, Köln 1956.
 Attentat auf den Mächtigen. Fischer, Frankfurt am Main 1957
 Das Tier oder Die Geschichte eines Bären, der Oskar hieß. Fischer, Frankfurt am Main 1958.
 Der vierte König. Hegner, Köln 1961
 Daraus als Einzelausgabe: Die Legende vom vierten König. Mit Zeichnungen von Celestino Piatti. Hegner, Köln 1964; Artemis & Winkler, Düsseldorf 2008, .
 Der Aufruhr des Gerechten. Eine Chronik. Hegner, Köln 1963.
 Am Abend der Zeit. Hegner, Köln 1970.
 Taurische Spiele. Hegner, Köln 1971.
 Sperlingsschlacht. Hegner, Köln 1972.
 Degenhall. Artemis, Zürich 1975.
 Die Reise unter den Abendstern.
 Die Arche, die Schiffbruch erlitt. Insel Verlag, Leipzig 1935 (Insel-Bücherei 471/1)
 Das Lied der Väter. Insel Verlag, Leipzig 1937 (Insel-Bücherei 514/1)
 Die Heiligen Drei Könige. Arche, Zürich 1945
 Semjon, der ausging, das Licht zu holen. Eine Weihnachtserzählung aus dem alten Estland. Reinhardt, Basel 1947.
 Neuausgabe als: Stern über der Grenze. Hegner, Köln 1950.
 Der große offenbare Tag. Die Erzählung eines Freundes. Summa, Olten 1949; Reclam (UB 8018), Stuttgart 1972, .
 Norwegische Reise. Arche, Zürich 1951.
 Das Christkind aus den großen Wäldern. Mit 10 Zeichnungen von Richard Seewald. Hegner, Köln 1954; Artemis & Winkler, Zürich 1998, 
 Nikodemus. Arche, Zürich 1952.
 Hinter den Linien. Erzählungen. Hegner, Köln 1952.
 Der Mantel der Barmherzigkeit. Hegner, Köln 1953.
 Um die neunte Stunde oder Nikodemus und Simon. Hegner, Köln 1953.
 Das Wiedersehen und Der gekreuzigte Diakon. Hegner, Köln 1957.
 Unschuld der Sünde. Fischer, Frankfurt am Main 1957.
 Die Eidgenossen des Sommers. Die Nachfahren Petri. Zwei Erzählungen. Hegner, Köln 1958.
 Die Geisterbahn. Hegner, Köln 1959; als dtv-Taschenbuch, München 1968.
 Die Söhne Hiobs. Hegner, Köln 1962.
 Dragonergeschichte. Novelle. Hegner, Köln 1963.
 Schicksale und Abenteuer. Geschichten aus vielen Leben. Zehn neue Erzählungen. Hegner, Köln 1968.
 Schattengericht. Vier neue Erzählungen. Hegner, Köln 1967.
 Die Heimat der Verbannten. Hegner, Köln 1968.
 Der Mensch in der Zelle. Dichtung und Deutung des gefangenen Menschen. Hegner, Köln 1951.
 Vom Sinn des Alters. Eine Betrachtung. Arche, Zürich 1952.
 Untergang und Verwandlung. Betrachtungen und Reden. Arche, Zürich 1952.
 Erkundungen in gestern und morgen. Arche, Zürich 1956.
 Bürger in Zeit und Ewigkeit. Antworten. Marion von Schröder, Hamburg 1956.
 Der Abfall vom Menschen. Zwei Vorträge. Walter, Olten 1961.
 Verhüllte Altäre. Ansprachen. Hegner, Köln 1962.
 Flucht und Bleibe. Ein Wort an die geflüchteten und vertriebenen Deutschen. Hegner, Köln 1965.
 Wagnis der Gegenwart. Essays. Kreuz, Stuttgart 1965.
 Die baltischen Länder im geistigen Spektrum Europas. Ein Vortrag, 1965.
 Über die Redlichkeit. Essay. Hegner, Köln 1967.
 Das Leben Jesu. Insel, Leipzig 1936.
 Daraus als Einzelausgabe: Die Weihnachtsgeschichte. Arche, Zürich 1950.
 Der Held. Weg und Wahn Karl XII., 1958
 Der Gefangene der Botschaft. Drei Stücke (mit Strenger Abschied. und Die Kosaken oder wo ist dein Bruder Abel). Nachwort von Max Wehrli. Hegner, Köln 1964
 Das Feuer Christi. Leben und Sterben des Johannes Hus in siebzehn dramatischen Szenen. Kreuz, Stuttgart 1965
 Macht und Freiheit. Zwei Romane (Die Freiheit des Gefangenen – Die Macht der Ohnmächtigen). Hegner (Die Bücher der Neunzehn 82), Köln 1961; Kerle, Freiburg 1983, .
 Gesammelte Erzählungen. Hegner, Köln 1965.
 Aufstand und Ergebung. 3 Romane (Attentat auf den Mächtigen – Die letzte Welt – Der Aufruhr des Gerechten). Hegner, Köln 1973, .
 Geschichten aus vielen Leben. Sämtliche Erzählungen. Artemis, Zürich 1977.
 Grenzlinien. Eine Auswahl aus seinem Werk. Hrsg. von Matthias Wörther. Essay von Werner Ross. Artemis, Zürich 1987, .

References 

1908 births
1984 deaths
People from Ostrów Wielkopolski
People from the Province of Posen
German-language writers